These are the main career statistics of former Argentine professional tennis player Guillermo Vilas, whose playing career lasted from 1969 through 1992.

ATP Tour performance timeline

Grand Slam tournaments finals

Singles: 8 (4 titles, 4 runner-ups)

Grand Prix year-end championships finals

Singles: 1 (1 title)

WCT year-end championship finals

Singles: 1 (1 runner-up)

Career finals

Grand Prix/WCT Singles titles (62)

Grand Prix/WCT Singles runners-ups (42)

ILTF Singles titles (6)

ILTF Doubles titles (16)
 1973 (1) – Buenos Aires
 1974 (4) – Buenos Aires, Tehran, Toronto, Hilversum
 1975 (3) – Barcelona, Louisville, Hilversum
 1977 (4) – Buenos Aires, Tehran, Nice, Baltimore
 1978 (2) – Aix-En-Provence, Munich
 1979 (2) – North Conway, San Jose (Costa Rica)

Records

 These records were attained in Open Era of tennis.
 ^ Denotes consecutive streak.

Notes

References

External links
 
 
 
 

Vilas, Guillermo